Montecristo National Park is a large national park centered on the Montecristo cloud forest in Mesoamerica. Montecristo National Park is located in the north-western tip of El Salvador, a country in Central America known for its wildlife diversity.

It was founded in 2008, and covers an area of 19.73 km2. The national park, together with Montecristo Trifinio National Park in Honduras and Trifinio Biosphere Reserve in Guatemala, form the Trifinio Fraternidad Transboundary Biosphere Reserve.

References

External links

 Official site 

National parks of El Salvador
Central American pine–oak forests
Central American montane forests